Politicon was an annual, non-partisan political convention in the United States. Politicon's vision was to bring "Republicans, Democrats, and people of all political stripes together to banter and spar over the most topical issues in smart and entertaining ways that often poke fun at both sides of the aisle." It has been called the "Comic-Con of politics" and the "Coachella of politics".

It was first held in Los Angeles in 2015, with the last on held on October 26–27, 2019, in Nashville, Tennessee, at the Music City Center. It eventually dissolved in 2022.

Conventions

Politicon 2019 

For the first time, Politicon moved from Los Angeles to the Music City Center in Nashville, Tennessee.  Notable speakers included former Minnesota Senator Al Franken (D), Kentucky Secretary of State Alison Lundergan Grimes, Republican strategist and commentator Ana Navarro, political commentator Ann Coulter, journalist April Ryan, CNN Politics reporter Chris Cillizza, Clay Aiken, former DNC Chair Donna Brazile, former FBI Director James Comey, Mayor of Knox County, TN Glenn Jacobs, former RNC Chair and White House Chief of Staff Reince Priebus, former White House Press Secretary Sarah Huckabee Sanders, Fox News anchor Sean Hannity, and conservative commentator Tomi Lahren.

2020 presidential candidates in attendance included Howie Hawkins (G), Mark Sanford (R), Joe Walsh (R), and Bill Weld (R).

The full list of expected speakers is as follows:

Politicon 2018 
Politicon 2018 took place at the Los Angeles Convention Center. Notable speakers included Kentucky Secretary of State Alison Lundergan Grimes, actress Alyssa Milano, political advisor Amanda Carpenter, Republican strategist and commentator Ana Navarro, political commentator Ann Coulter, Speaker of the California State Assembly Anthony Rendon, journalist April Ryan, MSNBC anchor Ari Melber, former Libertarian presidential candidate Austin Petersen, commentator Bakari Sellers, former Deputy National Security Advisor Ben Rhodes, conservative commentator Ben Shapiro, former Chief of Staff to the VP Bill Kristol, Representative Brendan Boyle (D-PA02), gun control activist and Parkland shooting survivor Cameron Kasky, former NJ Governor Chris Christie (R), former Representative David Jolly (R-FL13), Virginia Delegate Elizabeth Guzmán (D), host of NBC's Stay Tuned on Snapchat Gadi Schwartz, Mayor of Knox County, TN Glenn Jacobs, Representative Judy Chu (D-CA27), comedian Kathy Griffin, former President of the California State Senate Kevin de León, gun rights activist and Parkland shooting survivor Kyle Kashuv, former RNC Chair Michael Steele, Mayor of Stockton, CA Michael Tubbs, former Representative Patrick Murphy (D-FL18), Representative Ted Lieu (D-CA33), conservative commentator Tomi Lahren, and Fox News anchor Tucker Carlson. 
 Adam Carolla
 Adam Richmond
 Adam Yenser
 Aida Rodriguez
 Aimee Allison
 Alex Ebert
 Alex Marlow
 Alexi McCammond
 Alicia Menendez
 Alison Brettschneider
 Alison Lundergan Grimes
 Alyssa Milano
 Amanda Carpenter
 Amanda Chen
 Amy Holmes
 Ana Kasparian
 Ana Navarro
 Anand Giridharadas
 Andrew Klavan
 Ani Zonneveld
 Ann Coulter
 Annie Linskey
 Anthony Rendon
 April Ryan
 Ari Melber
 Austin Petersen
 Donald Trump baby balloon
 Bakari Sellers
 Ben Gleib
 Ben Higgins
 Ben Jackson
 Ben Rhodes
 Ben Shapiro
 Ben Stein
 Bill Kristol
 Brad Jenkins
 Bradley Whitford
 Brandon Darby
 Brendan Boyle
 Brian Weeden
 Cameron Kasky
 Carter Page
 Carter Sherman
 Catherine Rampell
 Celeste Headlee
 Cenk Uygur
 Chad Goes Deep
 Charles Mahtesian
 Charlie Kirk
 Chris Christie
 Chris Fairbanks
 Chris Gore
 Christina Tobin
 Christine Pelosi
 Clay Aiken
 Cliff Maloney
 Corey Sienega
 Dan Bongino
 David Brock
 David Frum
 David Jolly
 David Pakman
 David Urban
 Deborah Flora
 Dennis Rodman
 Douglas Loverro
 Drew Pinsky
 Drennon Davis
 Eddie Izzard
 Elayne Boosler
 Elise Jordan
 Elisha Krauss
 Elizabeth Guzmán
 Emiliana Guereca
 Eric Golub
 Esther Ku
 Evan Sayet
 Felicia Michaels
 Frangela
 Fred Guttenberg
 Gadi Schwartz
 Gautam Raghavan
 George Halvorson
 George Nield
 Glenn Jacobs
 Grace Parra
 Greg Autry
 Greg Miller
 Guy Benson
 Hal Sparks
 Hasan Piker
 Helen Jones
 Henry Winkler
 Hope Hall
 Ildefonso Ortiz
 Jack Bryan
 Jacqueline Alemany
 Jacob Soboroff
 Jamaiah Adams
 James Carville
 James Hohmann
 Jamie Kilstein
 Janaya Khan
 Jason Winston George
 Jason Johnson
 Jennifer Rubin
 Jeremy Boreing
 Jess McIntosh
 Jesse Lee Peterson
 Jill Wine-Banks
 Joel Pollak
 Joel Valenzuela
 Joey Greer
 Johann Hari
 John Chiang
 John Fugelsang
 John Hoffman
 John Thomas
 Jonathan Capehart
 Jonathan Swan
 Joshua Malina
 Joy Reid
 Joe Wilson
 Judd Dunning
 Judy Chu
 Julie Chavez Rodriguez
 Kamy Akhavan
 Karine Jean-Pierre
 Kasie Hunt
 Kathy Griffin
 Kaya Jones
 Ken Dilanian
 Kendrick Sampson
 Kevin De Leon
 Kristin Fraser
 Kurt Bardella
 Kyle Kashuv
 Kyle Kulinski
Lawrence O'Donnell
 Elizabeth Bruenig
 Liz Wheeler
 Lizzy Cooperman
 Lou Diamond Phillips
 Kenny and Keith Lucas
 Malcolm Nance
 Mark Joseph
 Markos Moulitsas
 Mayra Macias
 Mehrnoush Yazdanyar
 Melina Abdullah
 Michael Avenatti
 Michael D'Antonio
 Michael J. Knowles
 Michael Steele
 Michele Dauber
 Mindy Robinson
 Morgan Radford
 Michael Tubbs
 Mo'Kelly
 Mueller, She Wrote
 Natasha Korecki
 Nate Boyer
 Nate Craig
 Nayyera Haq
 Nico Pitney
 Nomiki Konst
 Norman Golightly
 Patrick Murphy
 Philip Rucker
 Rachel Carmona
 Randy Sklar
 Rayne Steinberg
 Richard A. Fowler
 Richard Lui
 Richard Painter
 Richard Schiff
 Rick Ungar
 R. J. Cutler
 Roaming Millennial
 Ruth Marcus
 Sally Kohn
 Sam Seder
 Sara Gorman
 Scott Bland
 Scott Conroy
 Scott Wilson
 Scottie Nell Hughes
 Shasti Conrad
 Shawna Thomas
 Shermichael Singleton
 Sky & Nancy Collins
 Sonja Schmidt
 Stephanie Miller
 Sterlin Lujan
 Steven Olikara
 Tad Rams
 Tanika Ray
 Ted Lieu
 Terry W. Virts
 Tiffany Cross
 Tomi Lahren
 Touré
 Tucker Carlson
 Vince Houghton
 Virginia Heffernan
 Xeni Jardin
 Yasmin Kadir
 Yvette Nicole Brown
 Zack Czajkowski
 Zerlina Maxwell

References

External links
 Official website

Political conventions in the United States